"Happy" is a song by Lighthouse Family, which was released as a single in July 2002. The song was the third pop single written by British duo Lighthouse Family for their third album Whatever Gets You Through the Day (2001). The song was produced by Kevin Bacon and Jonathan Quarmby. The song reached outside the top 50 in the United Kingdom as well as being in the top 30 in the World RnB Top 30 Singles Chart.

Track listing
 UK CD1
 "Happy" — 4:35
 "High" (Francois K Vocal Mix) — 10:34
 "Whatever Gets You Through the Day" — 4:40
 "Happy" (Video)

 UK CD2
 "Happy" — 4:35
 "Happy" (Rui Da Silva Mix) — 7:07
 "Happy" (Ferry Corsten Mix) — 7:51

 UK Cassette
 "Happy" — 4:35
 "Happy" (Manhattan Clique Vocal Mix) — 8:23

 European CD1
 "Happy" — 4:35
 "Happy" (Rui Da Silva Mix) — 7:07
 "High" (Francois K Vocal Mix) — 10:34
 "Whatever Gets You Through the Day" — 4:40
 "Happy" (Video)

 European CD2: The Remixes
 "Happy" — 4:35
 "Happy" (Rui Da Silva Mix) — 7:07
 "Happy" (Manhattan Clique Vocal Mix) — 8:23
 "Happy" (Liquid People Club Mix) — 7:23
 "Happy" (Ferry Corsten Mix) — 7:51

Charts

Chart performance
After the release of "Happy" in the UK, it reached to #51 in the UK Singles Chart and stayed in the charts for 1 week.

"Happy" also reached the top 30 in the World RnB Top 30 Singles and stayed in the charts for 3 weeks.

External links
Official Charts Company - UK chart performance of Lighthouse Family's "Happy"
World RnB Top 30 Singles performance of Lighthouse Family's "Happy"

2002 singles
Lighthouse Family songs
Songs written by Paul Tucker (musician)
Song recordings produced by Jonathan Quarmby
2001 songs